Edwin Joseph Lisle March Philipps de Lisle, DL FSA (13 June 1852 – 5 May 1920) was a Conservative Member of Parliament for Loughborough in England from 1886 to 1892. He was the seventh son of Ambrose Lisle March Phillipps De Lisle and Laura Maria Clifford.

A Catholic, he studied at St. Mary's College, Oscott (as did his brothers Ambrose (a JP), Everard (awarded VC), Osmund, Francis, Rudolph and Gerard), where he was awarded a Good conduct medal in 1872. Apart from being MP for Mid-Leicestershire he also held office as Leicestershire's Deputy Lieutenant. 

Edwin de Lisle spent all his life in Leicestershire, living at Charnwood Lodge with his wife, Agnes Henrietta Ida Hope, and their eight children. 

A stained-glass window dedicated to his memory is located on the East side of Arundel Cathedral.

References
The Oscottian, St Mary's College Oscott, 1888

 Mosley, Ch. (ed.), Burke's Peerage, Baronetage & Knightage, 107th edition, Wilmington, Delaware, U.S.A.: Burke's Peerage (Genealogical Books) Ltd, 2003, vol. 2 pag 1694.

External links 
 

1852 births
1920 deaths
Alumni of St Mary's College, Oscott
Conservative Party (UK) MPs for English constituencies
Deputy Lieutenants of Leicestershire
Members of the Parliament of the United Kingdom for Loughborough
UK MPs 1886–1892